The Mecca Province, also known as the Mecca Region, is one of the 13 provinces of Saudi Arabia. It is located in the historic Hejaz region, and has an extended coastline on the Red Sea. Its capital is Mecca, the holiest city in Islam, and its largest city is Jeddah, which is Saudi Arabia's main port city. The province accounts for 26.29% of the population of Saudi Arabia and is named after the holy city of Mecca.

Historically, the area was inhabited by the Quraysh, the Banu Kinanah and the Thaqif, among other tribes. Part of the Hejaz region, the province has seen several exchanges of power between many Islamic realms within a short period of time. The province gains its significance as it contains the city of Mecca, the birthplace of Muhammad, and several other historic Islamic sites, such as the village of Hudaybiyyah, where the Treaty of Hudaybiyyah is said to have been agreed upon. More recently, the province was modernized under the Ottoman Empire and the Kingdom of Saudi Arabia after the oil boom.
Most of the population is concentrated in three cities: Jeddah, Mecca and Ta'if. Jeddah is the largest city in the province and the second-largest in Saudi Arabia with an estimated population of 2,867,446 as of 2020. Mecca is the second-largest city in the province and third-largest in the kingdom at 1,323,624. After the city of Ta'if at third place, Rabigh, Shafa, Turbah and Jumum are other populous cities and towns in the region. The region receives Muslim pilgrims of the Umrah and the Hajj around the year and its population increases by up to 2 million during the Hajj. The province also hosts part of the Haramain high-speed railway line, which is Saudi Arabia's first and only high-speed railway line.

The province is divided into 11 governorates, of which 5 have been classified Category A and the rest, Category B, with Mecca serving as the administrative headquarters and capital of the province. It is governed by an Emir, translated as Governor from Arabic, who is assisted by the Deputy Governor, both appointed by the King of Saudi Arabia. The current emir is Khalid bin Faisal Al Saud, who has held the position for a second term since 2015.

History 
Ancient Mecca was an oasis on the old caravan trade route that linked the Mediterranean world with South Arabia, East Africa, and South Asia. The town was located about midway between Maʾrib in the south and Petra in the north, and it gradually developed by Roman and Byzantine times into an important trade and religious centre. Ptolemy's inclusion of Macoraba, a city of the Arabian interior, in his Guide to Geography was long held to show that Mecca was known to the Hellenistic world. Since the late 20th century, however, some scholarship has called the identification of Macoraba with Mecca into question.

According to Islamic tradition, Abraham and Ishmael, his son by Hagar, built the Kaʿbah as the house of God. The central point of pilgrimage in Mecca before the advent of Islam in the 7th century, the cube-shaped stone building has been destroyed and rebuilt several times. During pre-Islamic times the region was ruled by a series of Yemeni tribes. Under the Quraysh it became a type of city-state, with strong commercial links to the rest of Arabia, Ethiopia, and Europe. Mecca became a place for trade, for pilgrimage, and for tribal gatherings. The city of Jeddah is believed to have been a fishing hamlet occupied by early Yemeni tribes. The region has held significant religious importance greatly increased with the expeditions of Muhammad in the early 7th century. As the ancient caravan route fell into decline, Mecca lost its commercial significance and has since lived mainly on the proceeds from the annual pilgrimages and the gifts of Muslim rulers.

The city of Mecca was sacked by the Umayyad general al-Ḥajjāj ibn Yūsuf, and thereafter the city, and at the time, the region, acknowledged the power of the Umayyad caliphate at Damascus and, following the eclipse of that dynasty, of the ʿAbbāsid caliphate of Baghdad. The city suffered great indignity at the hands of the Shīʿite Qarmatians in 930 when that sect's leader Ṭāhir Sulaymān pillaged Mecca and carried off the Black Stone from the Kaʿbah. Beginning in the mid-10th century, the rulers of the city were chosen from the sharifs, or descendants of Muhammad, who retained a stronghold on the surrounding region while often paying homage to stronger political entities. The ability of the sharifs, originally moderate Shīʿites, to adapt to the changing political and religious climate ensured their preeminence in local affairs for the next 1,000 years. In 1269, the region came under the control of the Egyptian Mamlūk sultans. In 1517, dominion over the area passed to the Ottoman Empire, with its capital in Constantinople (now Istanbul). With the Ottoman collapse after World War I, control of Mecca was contested between the sharifs and the House of Saʿūd  of central Arabia, adherents to an austere, puritanical form of Islam known as Wahhābism. King Ibn Saʿūd conquered the region in 1925, and the region of Mecca became a province of the Kingdom of Saudi Arabia and the city became the capital of the province.

The region underwent extensive economic development as Saudi Arabia's petroleum resources were exploited after World War II, and the number of yearly pilgrims to Mecca has increased significantly.

Geography 
Most of the central and eastern portions of the province are desert, with the Hejaz mountains, which vary in elevation from 600 meters to 2000 meters, separating the relatively flat Nafud desert and coastal plains. Agriculture takes place in the region's many wadis and oases, with the most commonly-grown crops being dates and barley, alongside other vegetables and fruits. The city of Ta'if is famous for its cultivation of the Rosa × damascena flower, simplified as Damask rose and locally known as Ta'if rose.

The province has an extended coastline that is approximately 700 kilometers (430 mi) long, with many cities spread out across the coastline. Several archipelagos can be found across the coast of the province, along with some coral reefs, such as the Great Coral Reef, located approximately 15 km (9 mi) northwest of Jeddah and the Five Coral Reef, located 25 km (16 mi). The coastline faces Sudan to the west and Eritrea and Ethiopia to the south. The province is bordered by the Madinah Province to the north, the Riyadh Province to the east, and the Al Baha and 'Asir provinces to the south.

The Mecca Region hosts two of Saudi Arabia's 15 designated protected areas managed by the Saudi Wildlife Authority: the Mahazat as-Sayd Protected Area and the Saja Umm Ar-Rimth Natural Reserve, located on the eastern extremes of the province. Other minor sanctuaries in the province include the Saiysad Natural Reserve in the city of Ta'if and the Eastern Forest near Jeddah. The Hejaz mountains run through the center of the province, separating the Nafud desert from the western coastal plains, which run parallel to the coast of the province on the Red Sea.

Demographics

Population 
According to the Population Characteristics Surveys conducted by the General Authority of Statistics, the Mecca Province had a population of 8,557,766 as of December 2017, of which 4,516,577 were Saudis and 4,041,189 were foreign nationals. Divided by gender, 4,864,584 were males and 3,693,182 were females. The Mecca Province is the most populous province of Saudi Arabia and it has a population even larger than that of the Riyadh Region. With an estimated population of 4,076,000 as of 2019, Jeddah is the most populous city in the province and the second-most populous city in the country. The governorate with the largest population is the Jeddah Governorate. The sex ratio was approximately 132 males per 100 females.

Religion 
Censuses in Saudi Arabia do not collect or report data concerning religion. Sunni Islam of the Hanbali school of Islamic jurisprudence is the predominant religion overall in the country, with smaller numbers of Hanafis, Shafi‘is and Malikis. Muslims are estimated to live within the province, with even smaller numbers of Hindus, Christians and other religious groups, most of whom are expatriates from India and the Philippines, who mostly reside in Jeddah.

Languages 
The official language of Saudi Arabia is Arabic. The main regional dialect of the Mecca Province spoken by Saudis is Hejazi Arabic, with a minority of Najdi Arabic speakers in the eastern parts of the region. Saudi Sign Language is the principal language of the deaf community. The large expatriate communities also speak their own languages, the most numerous of which are some of the Indian languages, Filipino/Tagalog, Bengali and Urdu.

Education 
From 1,823,598 Saudi male residents above the age of 10, 87.57%, representing 1,596,946 persons had some form of formal education, while 226,652 were illiterate. As for females, from the 1,765,666 residents above the age of 10, 77.28% or 1,364,529 persons were formally educated, while 401,137 were illiterate.

Healthcare 
Of the province's Saudi residents who were above the age of 15, 1.15% reported some form of disability in 2016, with visual impairment being the most common form of disability, followed by reduced mobility, while 107,770 persons reported severe or extreme disability.

Government

The position of Governor (Emir) of the Makkah Province has been held by the following individuals since 1925:

Governorates
The Mecca region has 11 governorates, of which 5, Jeddah, Rabigh, Ta'if, Qunfudhah, and Laith, have been classified Category A, while the rest are Category B. The City of Mecca constitutes Mecca and the area surrounding the city and is the administrative center and capital of the province.

See also

 Sarawat Mountains
 Hijaz Mountains
 Tihamah

Notes

References

External links
 Emirate of Mecca Region official website
 A travel through the province of Mecca, Splendid Arabia: A travel site with photos and routes
 Umm Al Qura University in Mecca
 General Authority for Statistics - Kingdom of Saudi Arabia

 
Provinces of Saudi Arabia